Podostrog is a village in the municipality of Budva, Montenegro. There is a monastery by the name of Podmaine nearby.

Demographics
According to the 2011 census, its population was 688.

References

Populated places in Budva Municipality